Alice Upside Down is a 2007 comedy-drama film, based on the Alice series written by Phyllis Reynolds Naylor. The film was shot at Bishop DuBourg High School in St. Louis, Missouri. Screened in limited cinema in 2007, it was released wide straight-to-DVD on July 29, 2008. In North America, it aired on Starz Kids & Family, but in the early years, it was on demand. The film centers on Alice, an 11-year-old girl starting the sixth grade at a new school. It starred Alyson Stoner, Lucas Grabeel, Bridgit Mendler, Luke Perry, Penny Marshall, and Ashley Eckstein.

Plot
Alice McKinley (Alyson Stoner) is an 11-year-old girl who is facing many challenges. Her mother, Marie, died when she was very young, so she never really got to know her. She lives with her brother Lester (Lucas Grabeel) and her father, Ben (Luke Perry). The family moves to a new house, and soon meet their new neighbors, a girl Alice's age named Elizabeth (Parker McKenna Posey) and her mother. The next day Alice goes to school with Elizabeth and runs into a boy named Patrick (Dylan McLaughlin), whom she accidentally walked in on in a dressing room a few days earlier in his underwear. They line up to find their teachers, and Alice wants to be in beautiful Miss Cole's (Ashley Eckstein) class. Instead, she winds up with the seemingly evil (but actually strict and caring) Mrs. Plotkin (Penny Marshall), who gives her a hard time. Alice tries out for a play that Miss Cole's class is directing, and really wants the princess role. However, she is tone-deaf (although her dad is a musician), so she doesn't get the part. Her arch rival Pamela (Bridgit Mendler) gets the role instead, and Alice lands the role of a frog. Pamela hasn't been very nice to Alice ever since she came to school. Alice tells her dad and brother about it, but they end up being discouraging. Her dad opens a new shop, and Alice tries to set up her dad and Miss Cole up, as she's searching for a mother figure to replace the one she lost, but her dad says she is too young for him. Then her dad starts dating a new girl, Kelly, (Jilanne Klaus) and Alice is afraid her father will marry her. One night, Alice sneaks downstairs and sees her father and Kelly kissing, and it really hurts her. Her Aunt Sally (Ann Dowd), who is her mother's older sister, and her husband come to visit. Their father finds Aunt Sally annoying, as she thinks they can't take care of themselves. During the visit, Alice finds a video of her mother, and later watches the video. Her father reprimands her when he finds out, saying that those videos were private. Back at school, Alice slowly begins to bond with Mrs. Plotkin, and finds that she isn't as bad as everyone believes she is. She also realizes that Miss Cole isn't "all that". On the night of the play, Alice accidentally tears down the set, and everyone is upset at her, including Miss Cole. They tell her to leave, but Mrs. Plotkin consoles her. After the play, everyone apologizes, even Pamela. At the end of the film, Pamela and Alice are friends, Patrick asks Alice out, which leads to her having a daydream about her and Patrick kissing, and Lester is seen playing with his band, the Naked Nomads.

Cast
 Alyson Stoner as Alice McKinley
 Lucas Grabeel as Lester McKinley
 Bridgit Mendler as Pamela Jones
 Dylan McLaughlin as Patrick Long
 Parker McKenna Posey as Elizabeth Price
 Luke Perry as Ben McKinley
 Ashley Eckstein as Mrs. Cole
 Penny Marshall as Mrs. Plotkin
 Ann Dowd as Aunt Sally McKinley
 Boris Kodjoe as Mr. Edgecomb
 Jilanne Klaus as Kelly

Soundtrack
Alice Upside Down is a soundtrack album by the film of the same name, released on September 16, 2008 by Dauman Music and distributed by Federal Distribution.

Track listing

Home media
The film was released directly to DVD on July 29, 2008.

References

External links
 
 

2007 direct-to-video films
2007 films
2007 comedy-drama films
American children's comedy films
American comedy-drama films
American coming-of-age films
American direct-to-video films
Films based on children's books
2000s English-language films
2000s American films